The 1976 Campeonato Brasileiro Série A, (officially the II Copa Brasil) was the 20th edition of the Campeonato Brasileiro Série A. The championship had 54 clubs and followed the same rules of the 1975 championship. It was won by the holders Internacional.

First phase

Group A

Group B

Group C

Group D

Group E

Group F

Second phase

Group G

Group H

Group I

Group J

Group K

Group L

Group M

Group N

Group O

Group P

Third phase

Group Q

Group R

Semifinals

Finals

Final standings

References
 1976 Campeonato Brasileiro Série A at RSSSF

External links
Results at RSSSF

1976
1
Brazil
B